Tin Yuet is an MTR Light Rail stop. It is located at ground level at the centre of Tin Shing Road, between Tin Yuet Estate and Tin Ching Estate, in Tin Shui Wai, Yuen Long District. It began service on 7 December 2003 and belongs to Zone 5A. It serves Tin Yuet Estate and Tin Ching Estate.

References

MTR Light Rail stops
Former Kowloon–Canton Railway stations
Tin Shui Wai
Railway stations in Hong Kong opened in 2003
MTR Light Rail stops named from housing estates
2003 establishments in Hong Kong